Santa Maria Regina Pacis a Monte Verde is a 20th-century parochial church and titular church in Monteverde, central Rome.

History 

The first church for the Monteverde area was built in 1915. The present church was begun in 1925 but construction was stopped until 1931; construction was not complete until 1941. Thirty Jews were hidden in the church for a month during the Second World War.

The mosaic of the Virgin and Child was added by Silvio Novaro in 1949–54. From 1959 twenty-two paintings depicting the life of Mary were added; they were destroyed in a fire in 1980.

On 30 April 1969, it was made a titular church to be held by a cardinal-priest. Pope John Paul II visited in 1983.

Cardinal-protectors
Joseph Parecattil (1969–1987)
Antony Padiyara (1988–2000)
Francisco Alvarez Martínez (2001–2022)
Oscar Cantoni (2022–present)

References

External links

Titular churches
Rome Q. XII Gianicolense
Roman Catholic churches completed in 1942
20th-century Roman Catholic church buildings in Italy